Bartho Smit (15 July 1924 – 31 December 1986) was a South African writer, poet, dramatist and director. He was a member of the Sestigers, a group of influential Afrikaans writers of the 1960s. He wrote Moeder Hanna ("Mother Hanna") in 1959, which was an acclaimed drama about the Second Boer War. In 1962, he wrote the play  ("Well Without Water"), but it could not be performed in South Africa because of its overly political message.

Biography
He graduated from Standerton in 1949 with a bachelor's degree and in 1951 got a Master of Arts degree from the University of Pretoria. In 1949 he met actress Kita Redelinghuys and they married. From 1952 to 1957 they toured Paris, Munich and London as drama students under Jan Rabie. He also immersed himself in philosophy while in Europe.

His first publication was the story Outa Lukas, die natuurkind, which was published on 27 March 1941. In the forties he published stories and poems in magazines such as The Sentinel and Huisgenoot. In 1949 the publisher Unie-Boekhandel debuted his first book of poems, Mure: verse. He made his drama debut in 1955 with Moeder Hanna, but really came to public acclaim in 1962 with his play Putsonderwater. In 1978 he received the Hertzog Prize for drama for his body of work. In 1979 he won the Perskor Prize for Literature for Die Keiser. Also, in 1960, he received the Encyclopædia Britannica Award for the English translation of Die verminktes (The Maimed).

Publications

Poetry
Mure: verse. Unie-Boekhandel, 1949

Plays
Moeder Hanna. Afrikaanse Persboekhandel, 1955
Don Juan onder die boere. Human & Rousseau, 1960
Die verminktes. Perskor, 1960
Putsonderwater: ’n toneelstuk in vier dele. Afrikaanse Persboekhandel, 1962
Die man met die lyk om sy nek: ’n moord-komedie. Afrikaanse Persboekhandel, 1967
Christine. Tafelberg, 1971
Die man met die alibi. Afrikaanse Persboekhandel, 1971
Bacchus in die Boland. Perskor, 1974
Die keisier: variasies op ’n sprokie van Hans Andersen. Perskor, 1977

Sketches
Losgoed. Perskor, 1974

References

External links

1924 births
1986 deaths
People from JB Marks Local Municipality
Afrikaner people
Afrikaans-language writers
South African poets
Sestigers
20th-century poets
University of Pretoria alumni
Hertzog Prize winners for drama
Deaths from cancer in South Africa